Donkor is an Ashanti surname. Notable people with the Ashanti surname include:

Aaron Donkor (born 1995), German American football player
Godfried Donkor (born 1964), Ghanaian artist
Isaac Donkor (born 1991), Ghanaian footballer
Isaac Donkor (born 1995), Ghanaian footballer
Kimathi Donkor, British artist
Menaye Donkor (born 1981), Canadian businesswoman and philanthropist
George Nana Donkor, EBID president 

Also In the Akan culture, Donkor was also a name given to Slaves.
Surnames of Ashanti origin
Surnames of Akan origin